Skelton Lake services (also known as Leeds Skelton Lake services) is a motorway service area operated by Extra, on the M1 motorway near Leeds, West Yorkshire, England. It is located on Junction 45 of the Motorway which also links into the A63 (into Leeds). It lies on the south side of the motorway; however, the junction affords access to, and from,  all directions.

History
The M1/A1 link road between Leeds (now Junction 43 of the M1) and the A1(M) at Hook Moor, opened in February 1999. Although the slip roads were built in 1999, it was ten years before Junction 45 was opened to lead along a  dual carriageway (designated the A63) westwards into Leeds. Extra submitted an application to build a service station in the area (known as Skelton Grange) in 2005, which was rejected by the government.

A second set of amended plans were lodged with Leeds City Council in spring 2016, and permission for the site was granted in early 2017, with an interim bill of £50 million. Morgan Sindall were appointed as builders and by 2018, the bill was estimated at £60 million, with a projected opening date of summer 2019.

The £64 million service station opened in March 2020 with just the general shop and fuelling station from the outset due to the Covid-19 pandemic. The station was billed as the greenest motorway service station in the United Kingdom, having a "living roof", access to the nature reserve at St Aidan's, and a viewing platform overlooking Skelton Lake. The design of the station, particularly its roof, reflects the green corridor that site sits in.

The site, which saw 400 jobs during the construction phase, and now employs 300 people, also has a 100-bedroom hotel. As the site is located off Junction 45 of the M1, it is accessible in both directions of the motorway and from the A63.

References

External links
MSA online website

2020 establishments in England
M1 motorway service stations
Extra motorway service stations
Buildings and structures in West Yorkshire
Transport in West Yorkshire
Services